Billy Ray Smith may refer to:
Billy Ray Smith Sr. (1935–2001), American football defensive lineman
Billy Ray Smith Jr. (born 1961), American football linebacker for the San Diego Chargers

See also
Billy Smith (disambiguation)